Lodderia lodderae, common name Lodder's liotia, is a minute sea snail or micromollusc, a marine gastropod mollusc in the family Skeneidae.

Description
The diameter of the shell attains 2 mm. The small, white shell has a discoidal shape. The 4½ whorls are ornamented with several spiral subobsolete lirae. The umbilicus is open. The aperture is almost circular, reflexed and thickened. It is recognized by the strong concentric keels and the absence of transverse sculpture.

Distribution
This marine species is endemic to Australia. It is common and occurs off New South Wales, Victoria, South Australia and Tasmania.

References

 Allan, J.K. 1950. Australian Shells: with related animals living in the sea, in freshwater and on the land. Melbourne : Georgian House xix, 470 pp., 45 pls, 112 text figs.
 Cotton, B.C. 1959. South Australian Mollusca. Archaeogastropoda. Handbook of the Flora and Fauna of South Australia. Adelaide : South Australian Government Printer 449 pp

External links
 

lodderae
Gastropods of Australia
Gastropods described in 1884